is a 2D run and gun video game developed by M2 and published by Konami for WiiWare. It is the twelfth original installment in the Contra series. It was released in Japan on May 12, 2009, PAL regions on September 4, 2009, and North America on September 7, 2009.

Gameplay

Contra ReBirth retains the same sprite-based side-scrolling gameplay as the series' earlier installments. The game can be played with the standard Wii Remote, as well as with the Classic Controller or a Nintendo GameCube controller. As with most Contra games, up to two players can play simultaneously. The player initially has a choice between two different player characters: Bill Rizer, the traditional Contra hero, or Genbei Yagyu from Neo Contra. Two additional characters: Brownie (Tsugumin in the Japanese version), an android shaped like a small girl; and Plissken, a tall reptilian humanoid alien (whose name is a tribute to the Snake Plissken movie character), can also be selected once the player has completed the game on Easy (Brownie) and Normal (Plissken).

The dual weapon system from Contra III: The Alien Wars returns and the player's normal gun can now shoot in autofire once again. The power-ups in this installment consists of a Spread Shot, a Laser Gun and a Homing Gun. The traditional flamethrower, however, is missing. Playing on the Easy setting allows the player to always keep their current weapon after losing a life, a feature not available in any of the other settings, but locks the player out of the final boss stage and true ending, which usually occurs after all five main stages are completed.

Plot
In 2633, the Neo-Salamander Force, led by their mysterious leader Chief Salamander, travel back to 1973 to take out the Contra force, when the Earth's defenses are considered by them as "primitive". They end up establishing a base on the ruins of the Shizuoka temple at the Yucatán Peninsula in Mexico. Bill Rizer and Genbei Yagyu, two members of the present-day Contra team, are deployed by the Galactic President to travel back in time to stop them. With the help of Brownie or Tsugumin (a miniature gynoid  similar to Browny from Contra: Hard Corps) and Plissken (a reptilian alien) the Contra warriors manage to take down the Neo Salamander Force. However, Chief Salamander is nowhere to be seen. In the true ending of the game, it is revealed Chief Salamander is actually "Plissken", who has infiltrated the Contra unit under an assumed name.

Audio
The game's soundtrack was composed by Manabu Namiki, who worked on the other titles in the ReBirth series. The music consists of remixes of previous Contra songs. The official album was released on March 24, 2010 in a compilation with Castlevania: The Adventure ReBirth'''s music.

ReceptionContra ReBirth was received "favorable" reviews from Metacritic. IGN given the score with 8.2/10. The game was nominated for Game of the Year by Nintendo Power, as well as WiiWare Game of the Year and Best Action Game, but lost to Epic MickeySee alsoCastlevania: The Adventure ReBirthGradius ReBirth''

Notes

References

External links
Konami's official page for Contra ReBirth

2009 video games
Wii games
WiiWare games
Wii-only games
Contra (series)
Retro-style video games
Run and gun games
Video games about time travel
Video game reboots
Video games developed in Japan
Video games set in Mexico
Video games scored by Manabu Namiki
Cooperative video games
Multiplayer and single-player video games